For the Love of Mariastella (also known as Turi della tonnara) is a 1946 Italian melodrama film written and directed by Pino Mercanti. Based on a story of the Sicilian writer Giuseppe Zucca, it was mainly shot in the tonnara of Castellammare del Golfo, with some scenes shot in the tonnaras of Scopello and of San Vito Lo Capo. It is considered as a progenitor of pink neorealism.

Cast
Otello Toso as  Turi della Tonnara, aka 'Malacarne' 
Mariella Lotti as Mariastella 
Amedeo Nazzari as Zù Bastiano 
Umberto Spadaro as Fifi the Hunchback
Giovanni Grasso jr. as Raìs Pietro 
Natale Cirino as the Trapanese
 Anna Silena as  Maruzza 
Carlo Sposito as Rosalino
 Rosetta Romano  as Donna Agatina
 Salvatore Chimenti as Don Papò

References

External links

1946 films
Italian drama films
1946 drama films
Films directed by Pino Mercanti
Italian black-and-white films
Melodrama films
1940s Italian films